The 1980 IBF World Championships were held in Jakarta, Indonesia in 1980. Following the results of the men's doubles.

Main stage

Section 1

Section 2

Section 3

Section 4

Final stage

Remarks

External links 
http://newspapers.nl.sg/Digitised/Page/straitstimes19800528.1.26.aspx
http://newspapers.nl.sg/Digitised/Page/straitstimes19800529.1.28.aspx
http://newspapers.nl.sg/Digitised/Page/straitstimes19800530.1.34.aspx
http://newspapers.nl.sg/Digitised/Page/straitstimes19800531.1.30.aspx

1980 IBF World Championships